Chamaeleoaspis is a genus of tiny trilobites found in Early to Middle Eifelian marine strata of Africa and Europe. The two species look very similar to the trilobites of the related genera Cyphaspis and Otarionella, in which the species were originally, successively classified in.  Fossils of the older species, C. lkomalii, are found in a locality at the southern end of the Maider Basin, in the Anti-Atlas Mountains.  Fossils of the type species, C. chamaeleo, are found in the Middle Eifelian-aged Ohle Formation in Endorf, Germany..

References

External links

Proetida genera
Devonian trilobites of Africa
Devonian trilobites of Europe
Early Devonian first appearances
Trilobites of Africa
Middle Devonian genus extinctions